Hollis Gillespie is a humor columnist, writer and comedian based in Atlanta, Georgia.  She wrote for Atlanta's Creative Loafing weekly for eight years until October 2008.  In 2004, Writers Digest named Hollis Gillespie a "Breakout Author of the Year." Other accolades include the "Best Columnist" (2001, 2002, 2005, 2006, 2007, 2008, 2009) and "Best Local Author" (2004, 2005, 2006, 2008, 2009) honors in the Creative Loafing "Best of Atlanta" Readers Survey. Atlanta magazine awarded her "Best 'Tell-All'" in 2006. In 2012, the Magazine Association of the Southeast granted a MAGS award to Hollis Gillespie for "Editorial Excellence."

Gillespie currently writes the "Ugly American" column for Paste Magazine and appears as a travel expert for NBC's Today Show, NBC's 11Alive, and as an on-air commentator for the WGCL-TV Atlanta CBS News Channel 46. From 2007–2014, she wrote the back-page column for Atlanta (magazine). and a commentator on NPR's All Things Considered. She is the author of the books Bleachy-Haired Honky Bitch, Confessions of a Recovering Slut, and  Trailer Trashed. Upon publication of her first book, Hollis Gillespie appeared as a guest on The Tonight Show with Jay Leno. Jay Leno called her "a very funny lady." The rights to her first book, Bleachy-Haired Honky Bitch, were optioned by both Sony Pictures and Paramount.  She has collaborated on film projects with Laura Dern, (star of HBO's Enlightened), Mitch Hurwitz (creator of Arrested Development), Amy Sherman Palladino (creator of Gilmore Girls), Bill Haber (producer of Rizzoli and Isles) and Sheri Elwood (creator of Call Me Fitz). In addition, she runs the Shocking Real Life Learning Center, which offers classes on social media, book writing, publishing, animation, film and television script writing. She is represented by the Creative Artists Agency in Los Angeles.

Hollis Gillespie is also a former flight attendant at Delta, where she was a qualified foreign-language interpreter in English, German and Spanish. Her fifth book, a YA fiction novel, was published in 2015. The title is We Will be Crashing Shortly.

Published works
My Dubious Efforts Toward Upward Mobility
Confessions of a Recovering Slut: And Other Love Stories
Bleachy-Haired Honky Bitch: Tales from a Bad Neighborhood
Unaccompanied Minor.

References

External links
Official site
Shocking Real Life Writing Academy
Hollis Gillespie's Back Page
Atlanta Magazine
Inappropriate Conversation with Hollis Gillespie

American columnists
American memoirists
Living people
American humorists
People from Burbank, California
Writers from Atlanta
Date of birth unknown
NPR personalities
American radio personalities
Women humorists
Journalists from California
American women non-fiction writers
American women columnists
Year of birth missing (living people)
21st-century American women